This is not a story (or This is not just a story; French: Ceci n’est pas un conte) is a story by the French author Denis Diderot written in 1772.

The three Moral Stories
This is not a story, Madame de La Carlière and the Supplément au voyage de Bougainville together make up a trilogy of moral stories written in 1772 that partially appeared in the Correspondance littéraire in 1773.

The intention of Diderot himself was for the three stories to be considered together: "le troisième conte donnera son sens aux deux premiers" (the third story will give meaning to the first two), he tells the reader. This intention is confirmed by the initial title of Madame de La Carlière, Second conte (French for Second story), and by the allusions to characters or developments of one of the stories in another. Subsequently, though, the editors did not respect this material and intellectual unity and the texts were edited separately. Jacques-André Naigeon himself published the three texts in his edition of the complete works of Diderot (1796), but separated the Supplément au voyage de Bougainville from the two other texts.

It seems coherent to consider les Deux Amis de Bourbonne, another short story by Diderot, in the same vein as these three stories: the piece takes place during the same era and the themes and the style are similar.

Summary
There are two different stories in This is not a story.

The first recounts the story of Tanié, who is in love with a venal and greedy woman, Madame Reymer. Tanié goes off to Saint-Domingue for ten years to make a fortune for her. Madame Reymer takes advantage of his absence and finds other lovers. When Tanié comes back from his voyage, he lives with Madame Reymer for around five years. Then, Monsieur de Maurepas proposes that he leave to do business with the North, which Tanié accepts to take on because he knows that Madame Reymer is only with him for his fortune. He dies of a fever some days after he departs.

In the second story, Diderot recounts the history of Gardeil and Mademoiselle de la Chaux. Out of love for him, Mademoiselle de la Chaux abandons all – her honor, her fortune, her family – to be with Gardeil. Somehow or other, they live happily. Gardeil, a translator by trade, works until he is no longer able. His wife helps him by learning Greek, Hebrew and other languages. She gives herself, body and soul, to make him happy, but one day he leaves her because she is no longer useful to him. She takes it very badly, but recovers some years later. She enrolls in the Académie des Inscriptions et Belles-Lettres and then writes a book (Les Trois Favorites, French for The Three Favorites), which she sends to the Marquise de Pompadour, a fervent admirer of good prose. She is invited to Versailles, but rejects this meeting and never ends up going. She ends her life in misery.

Diderot concludes his book in saying that to judge someone based on one single character trait is going a bit fast, but that there is a lot of truth in generalities.

Analysis
The title of Ceci n'est pas un conte, followed by Second conte (whose name completely contradicts the first title), betrays Diderot's game of denotation played against connotation. He plays with perceptions of reality and appearances, truth and falsity, as well as good, bad and the relativity of these notions. The Supplément au voyage de Bougainville, which evokes the morality of a civilisation from the end of the world, appears much like the keystone that confirms the importance of reflecting on the relationship between morality and guilt. Likewise to that of the painting The Treachery of Images by René Magritte, Diderot wants to tell us that a person's behavior is not in itself moral or immoral. Morality is not universal and therefore it is not revealed either.

References

Bibliography

The Three Stories 
 Christiane Frémont, Stanford French Review,, 1988, vol. 12, n° 2–3, p. 245-264.
 Michel Delon, introductory note in the edition of Les Œuvres de Diderot found in the bibliothèque de la Pléiade
 Valérie André, Féeries, 3, Politique du conte, 2006, [En ligne], mis en ligne le 4 mai 2007. URL : http://feeries.revues.org/document149.html. Consulté le 02 juillet 2008.

Ceci n'est pas un conte 
 The complete text on Project Gutenberg: Ceci n'est pas un conte.

Novels by Denis Diderot
1772 books